The Grange, located four miles north of Paris in Bourbon County, Kentucky, United States, was built in c.1818 in the Federal style of architecture.  It was listed on the National Register of Historic Places in 1973.

It was built as a house for Ned Stone, a slave dealer who eventually was killed in a mutiny on a slave ship.

References

External links

House in Bourbon County a mix of glorious and notorious, a 2011 newspaper article including a history of the house and its first owner, with photos
Bourbon County tour house both glorious, notorious author's blog version of the above newspaper article, with a few more photos
Notes on Edward Stone, article about the slave trader who built the house

Houses on the National Register of Historic Places in Kentucky
Federal architecture in Kentucky
Houses completed in 1818
Houses in Bourbon County, Kentucky
African-American history of Kentucky
Historic American Buildings Survey in Kentucky
National Register of Historic Places in Bourbon County, Kentucky
1818 establishments in Kentucky
History of slavery in Kentucky